Sampoorna Ramayanam is a 1958 Indian Tamil-language  Hindu mythological film directed by K. Somu. It is based on Valmiki's Ramayana. The film stars N. T. Rama Rao in the lead role of Rama and Sivaji Ganesan as Bharatha. It was released on 14 April 1958 and ran for over 264 days in theatres, thereby becoming a silver jubilee hit. The film was dubbed into Hindi as Ramayan in 1960.

Plot 

The story is the complete Ramayana from the birth of Rama to his Pattabhisheka after completing his exile.

Cast 
N. T. Rama Rao as Rama
Padmini as Sita
Sivaji Ganesan as Bharatha
P. V. Narasimha Bharathi as Lakshmana
Santo Krishnan as Hanuman
T. K. Bhagavathi as Ravana
V. Nagayya as Dasharatha
Pushpavalli as Kausalya
G. Varalakshmi as Kaikeyi

V. K. Ramasamy as Guhan
M. N. Rajam as Shurpanakha
Sandhya as Mandodari

Production 
After Town Bus (1955), its producer M. A. Venu decided that his next venture would be Sampoorna Ramayanam, based on the Ramayana, an Indian epic written by Valmiki. It was directed by K. Somu and produced by Venu under M. A. V. Pictures, while A. P. Nagarajan wrote the screenplay. Cinematography was handled by V. K. Gopanna, and the editing by T. Vijayarangam.

K. V. Srinivasan dubbed the voice of N. T. Rama Rao, who played Rama. S. S. Rajendran was initially offered to play Bharata but declined due to his aversion to act in films based on mythology; Sivaji Ganesan was later cast in that role. This marked Ganesan's first mythological film.

Soundtrack 
The music composed by K. V. Mahadevan. All lyrics were penned by A. Maruthakasi. Unlike most Tamil films of that era, the songs were composed to form a part of the narrative, as opposed to being standalone segments. S. Somasundaram was originally hired to sing a few songs, including "Veenai Kodiyudaiya" which was picturised on Ravana. As Bhagavati's lip synching could not match Somasundaram's fast singing, the singer was replaced with C. S. Jayaraman. Offended, Somasundaram left the film and at his request the songs he sang were dropped.

Release and reception 

Sampoorna Ramayanam was released on 14 April 1958, during Puthandu. Politician C. Rajagopalachari, who wrote the Ramayana as a serialised story in Kalki which was later published as a book, watched this film and appreciated it, particularly Ganesan's performance as Bharata. Usually he was a critic of cinema in general and did not think much about films. In a review dated 27 April 1958, the magazine Ananda Vikatan lauded Ganesan's performance, felt T. K. Bhagavathi was perfect for the role of Ravana, and called the film a must-watch. The film was a major commercial success and ran for over 264 days in theatres, thereby becoming a silver jubilee film, and also being responsible for a renewed interest in mythological films in Tamil cinema.

References

Bibliography

External links 

1950s Tamil-language films
1958 films
Films based on the Ramayana
Films scored by K. V. Mahadevan
Films with screenplays by A. P. Nagarajan
Hindu mythological films